Komenda College of Education is a co-educational teacher education college in Komenda, Central Region (Ghana). It is one of 46 public colleges of education in Ghana and participated in the DFID-funded Transforming Teacher Education and Learning Ghana (T-TEL) programme. In 2017, Komenda CoE implemented a project to go paperless. The Principal is Rev. Dr. Kwesi Nkum Wilson.

History 
Komenda College was established in 1948, on a site which had been used by the British Navy during World War II.

Komenda College of Education started out of the buildings(Barracks) left by the Fleet Air Arm of the British Navy after the World War II. Through the efforts of Mr. A.B. Sam, regent of Komenda, the legacy was leased to the Methodist Church Ghana, in 1947 to be used as a training college. The government made some renovation works on the buildings to make it suitable for educational use. On March 11, 1948, the first batch of students numbering forty men was enrolled to start an initial 2-year Teacher's Cert ‘B’ programme. In 1952, the college became a co-educational institution with its first batch of thirty women. The first principal of the college was Mr. Lawrence Alfred Creedy, a British citizen. The motto of the college is “Bepכwso Kurow Hyer3n”, meaning a city set on a hill, shines forth. The adopted strands by the founding father were; Academic excellence, Service to God and Service to mankind. Messrs R.C. Mensah, C.K. Penrose, Wonderful Dadson, K.A. Essuman and J.C.O. Okyere were among the pioneer tutors of the college.

The college has gone through the following academic programmes:

 2-year. Cert “B’.
 4-year. Cert “A”.
 2-year. Cert “A” (Post –Sec)
 3-year. Specialist (Music & Art)
 2-year Modular Course
 3-year Cert “A” (Post –Sec)
 4-year (Untrained Diploma in Basic Education)
 3-year Diploma in Basic Education

Notable alumni
 Ama Bame Busia - Politician; formerly member of the Ghana Council of State 
 Dora Francisca Edu-Buandoh - Academic; Pro Vice Chancellor of the University of Cape Coast
 Kwame Karikari - Journalist and academic; Director General of Ghana Broadcasting Corporation (1982-1984)
 Samuel Atta Mills - Member of parliament for the Komenda-Edina-Eguafo-Abirem Constituency (2017–)
 Kwamena Minta Nyarku - Member of parliament for the Cape Coast North Constituency (2021–)
 Titus Awotwi Pratt - Presiding Bishop of the Methodist Church Ghana, 2014 – 2018.

Principals

References 

Merged content from Komenda Teachers Training College. See Talk:Komenda Teachers Training College

Colleges of Education in Ghana
Central Region (Ghana)
Educational institutions established in 1948
1948 establishments in Gold Coast (British colony)